Loxostege leuconeuralis is a species of moth in the family Crambidae. It is found in Afghanistan.

This species has a wingspan of 32mm.

References

Pyraustinae